McCall College (McC) is an American private college located in McCall, Idaho. It primarily serves Valley County, Adams County and Idaho County. McCall also serves as a destination college for students from the Pacific Northwest.

Mission 
Provide meaningful post-secondary education for students of all ages helping them achieve their individual and social goals to develop a whole person in community and the world

History 
The most recent attempt to build a community-based college in McCall was first proposed by Dr. L. Bryan Williams on his arrival in McCall during the late summer of 2010. During 2011, Williams proposed the idea to a local businessperson, Woody Woodworth and a retired university administrator, Dave Hanson. These three founders incorporated McCall College on December 27, 2011.

In 2012, McCall College became registered with the Idaho State Board of Education so that it could offer certificates in higher education as a private proprietary college. By the summer of 2012, the school was working on recruitment and fundraising; its faculty members and administrators were working as unpaid volunteers. McCall began Professional Technical classes in May 2013. McC's first academic course, Introduction to Geology, was offered in the fall of 2013.
In 2014, McCall College received its 501(c)3 designation from the Internal Revenue Service.

Campus 
The primary campus of McCall College is located in the Park Place Professional Center in McCall Idaho. The campus occupies approximately 6000 square feet of office space. The campus consists of 4 classrooms, an academic center, a student center, offices and conference space. The college also offers Thursday night classes at St Luke's Boise Medical Center, Anderson Building.

Academics

Programs 
Professional Technical Certificate = ProTech

Leadership 
President
2012–present—Dr. L. Bryan Williams

Board Chair
2012–present—Woody Woodworth

Academic Dean
2012–present—Dr. R. Bruce Moore

Athletics 
McCall College neither currently fields athletic teams nor has a mascot.

References

External links 
 McCall College website

Vocational education in the United States
Buildings and structures in Valley County, Idaho
Private universities and colleges in Idaho
Educational institutions established in 2011
Education in Valley County, Idaho
2011 establishments in Idaho